The canton of Plateau de Millevaches is an administrative division of the Corrèze department, south-central France. It was created at the French canton reorganisation which came into effect in March 2015. Its seat is in Meymac.

It consists of the following communes:
 
Alleyrat
Ambrugeat
Bellechassagne
Bonnefond
Bugeat
Chavanac
Chaveroche
Combressol
Darnets
Davignac
Gourdon-Murat
Grandsaigne
Lestards
Lignareix
Maussac
Meymac
Millevaches
Péret-Bel-Air
Pérols-sur-Vézère
Peyrelevade
Pradines
Saint-Angel
Saint-Germain-Lavolps
Saint-Merd-les-Oussines
Saint-Pardoux-le-Vieux
Saint-Rémy
Saint-Setiers
Saint-Sulpice-les-Bois
Sornac
Soudeilles
Tarnac
Toy-Viam
Viam

References

Cantons of Corrèze